Deschamps is a common family name of French origin, which means "from the fields", from the French word champ = "field".

Adolphe Deschamps (1807–1875), Belgian statesman and publisher
Didier Deschamps (born 1968), French football player and manager
Émile Deschamps (1791–1871), French poet
Eustache Deschamps (1328–1415), French poet
François-Michel-Chrétien Deschamps (1683–1747), French playwright
Georges A. Deschamps (1911–1998), French American electrical engineer
Gérard Deschamps (born 1937), French artist
Gérard-Joseph Deschamps (1929-2022), Canadian Roman Catholic prelate
Hubert Deschamps (1923–1998), French actor, uncle of Jérôme
Jérôme Deschamps (born 1947), French actor, director and opera manager
Carlos Romero Deschamps (born 1944), Mexican politician
Johanne Deschamps (born 1959), Canadian politician
Léger Marie Deschamps (1716–1774), French philosopher and Benedictine monk
Marie Deschamps (born 1952), Canadian jurist
Noël Deschamps (1908–2005), Australian diplomat
Paul Deschamps (1888–1974), French medievalist, father of Hubert
Robert Deschamps (born 1940), Canadian politician
Victor-Auguste-Isidor Deschamps (1810–1883), Belgian cardinal and archbishop
Yvon Deschamps (born 1935), Canadian author and humorist

See also

References